Julianus, or Julian, surnamed the Egyptian (Latin: Julianus Ægyptius; fl. 6th century AD) was a Greek Byzantine administrator and epigrammatist.

Described in the lemmata of his epigrams as apo hypaton and apo hyparchon ("ex-prefect"), it is inferred that Julianus served as Prefect of Egypt at some point during the reign of Justinian. Seventy-one epigrams are ascribed to Julianus in the Greek Anthology. They are primarily of a sensual and descriptive character derivative of earlier poems of the same kind. There are also two epigrams addressed to Hypatius, the nephew of the emperor Anastasius, who was put to death in AD 532 for inciting a failed rebellion against Justinian. Another epigram concerns Joannes, the grandson of Hypatius.

Bibliography 

 Cameron, Alan. "Some Prefects Called Julian". Byzantion, vol. 47, 1977, pp. 42–64. JSTOR. Accessed 21 Aug. 2021.
 "Julianus", William Smith (ed.) Dictionary of Greek and Roman Biography and Mythology. Vol. II (London, 1870)
The Greek Anthology I], II, III, IV, [https://archive.org/details/in.ernet.dli.2015.529390 V (Loeb Classical Library) translated by W. R. Paton (London: Heinemann, 1916)

References 

Epigrammatists of the Greek Anthology
Byzantine poets